Cypraeovula iutsui is a species of sea snail, a marine gastropod mollusk in the family Cypraeidae, the cowries.

Distribution
This species occurs from the mouth of the Olifants River in the Western Cape, to Port Alfred, Eastern Cape, South Africa.

Description
Thin transparent beige mantle has beige or black conical papillae. The siphon is the same colour as mantle. The cephalic tentacles are slender, elongate and off-white. The short translucent white foot is wide at the front and rounded at the rear. The shell is globular, often nearly spherical, up to 41mm in length. Atlantic specimens vary in colour from pale plum to opaque white, with little dorsal marking. Indian Ocean specimens are more colourful, and may have red to rut- brown dorsal markings. The labrum is broad with a dull surface, and has 17 to 25 fine denticles on the inner edge, which usually extend as fine ridges for a few millimetres. The columella is deeply convoluted and poorly developed. The shell aperture  is narrow and of even width along its length.

Habitat 
Specimens of this species have been collected from 150 to 250m depth on the Agulhas Bank, and from below 50m on the Atlantic coast.

Conservation status 
No data is available on the conservation status of this species.

References

External links 

I
Gastropods described in 1974
Gastropods of Africa